All Saints' Church, Four Oaks is a Grade II* listed  Church of England parish church in Birmingham.

History

The foundation stone was laid on 11 April 1908 by the diocesan registrar J.B. Clarke The church was built to designs by the architect Edwin Francis Reynolds and consecrated on Saturday 30 October 1908 by the Bishop of Birmingham. 

The parish was formed from land taken from St James' Church, Hill.

Enlargements were undertaken in 1954 when a choir vestry was added, and the chancel and clergy vestry were added in 1965 by Wood, Kendrick & Williams.

Organ

The church has a pipe organ by Nicholson dating from 1921. A specification of the organ can be found on the National Pipe Organ Register.

References

Church of England church buildings in Birmingham, West Midlands
Churches completed in 1909
20th-century Church of England church buildings
Grade II* listed buildings in Birmingham
Grade II* listed churches in the West Midlands (county)
All Saints